Maki Kawamura (川村真樹 Kawamura Maki, born in Iwate Prefecture on February 9, 1979) is a Japanese ballerina for New National Theatre, Tokyo

Career 
1st Prize in the Junior Class at the 1994 Kobe Dance Competition.
1st Prize in the Junior Class at the 1994 All Japan Ballet Competition.
Won the Scholarship prize of Prix de Lausanne (the International dance competition in Lausanne) in 1995.

External links 
New National Theatre, Tokyo

Japanese ballerinas
People from Iwate Prefecture
Living people
Prix de Lausanne winners
1979 births